The 1994 California Courts of Appeal election was held November 8, 1994.
The judges of the California Courts of Appeal are either approved to remain in their seat or rejected by the voters. All of the judges kept their seats.

Results
Final results from the California Secretary of State:

District 1

Division 1

Division 2

Division 3

Division 4

Division 5

District 2

Division 1

Division 2

Division 3

Division 4

Division 5

Division 6

Division 7

District 3

District 4

Division 1

Division 2

Division 3

District 5

District 6

References

See also

Courts of Appeal elections, 1994
1994 Courts of Appeal